

Xeon 3000-series (uniprocessor)

"Lynnfield" (45 nm) 
 Based on Nehalem microarchitecture
 Uni-processor only
 All models except X3430 support Hyper-Threading
 All models support: MMX, XD bit, SSE, SSE2, SSE3, SSSE3, SSE4.1, SSE4.2, x64, SpeedStep, Turbo Boost, Smart Cache, VT-x, EPT, VT-d, TXT, ECC
 Die size: 296 mm²
 Steppings: B1

"Bloomfield" (45 nm) 
 Based on Nehalem microarchitecture
 Uni-processor only
 Quad Core models support: Hyper-Threading, Turbo Boost
 All models support: MMX, XD bit, SSE, SSE2, SSE3, SSSE3, SSE4.1, SSE4.2, x64, SpeedStep, Smart Cache, VT-x, EPT, ECC
 Die size: 263 mm²
 Steppings: D0

"Jasper Forest" (45 nm) 
 Based on Nehalem microarchitecture
 Uni-processor only
 LC3528 supports: Hyper-Threading, Turbo Boost
 All models support: MMX, XD bit, SSE, SSE2, SSE3, SSSE3, SSE4.1, SSE4.2, x64, SpeedStep, Smart Cache, VT-x, EPT, VT-d, ECC
 Die size: 263 mm²
 Steppings: B0

"Clarkdale" (MCP, 32 nm) 
 Based on Westmere microarchitecture
 Uni-processor only
 L3406 supports Hyper-Threading, Turbo Boost
 All models support: MMX, XD bit, SSE, SSE2, SSE3, SSSE3, SSE4.1, SSE4.2, x64, SpeedStep, Smart Cache, VT-x, EPT, VT-d, TXT, ECC
 Die size: 81 mm² (CPU Component)
 Steppings: C2

"Gulftown" (32 nm) 
 Based on Westmere microarchitecture
 Uniprocessor-only systems
 All models support: Hyper-Threading
 All models support: MMX, XD bit, SSE, SSE2, SSE3, SSSE3, SSE4.1, SSE4.2, x64, AES-NI, SpeedStep, Turbo Boost, Smart Cache, VT-x, EPT, VT-d, TXT, ECC
 Die size: 240 mm²
 Steppings: B1

Xeon 5000-series (dual-processor)

"Gainestown" (45 nm) 
 Based on Nehalem microarchitecture
 All models support: MMX, SSE, SSE2, SSE3, SSSE3, SSE4.1, SSE4.2, Demand-Based Switching (Intel's Server EIST), Intel 64, XD bit (an NX bit implementation), Intel VT-x, Intel EPT, Intel VT-d, Intel VT-c, Intel x8 SDDC
 All models support: Hyper-Threading, Turbo Boost except E5502, E5503, E5504, E5506, L5506, E5507
 All models support dual-processor configurations
 Die size: 263 mm²
 Steppings: D0

"Jasper Forest" (45 nm) 
 Based on Nehalem microarchitecture
 All models support: MMX, SSE, SSE2, SSE3, SSSE3, SSE4.1, SSE4.2, Demand-Based Switching (Intel's Server EIST), Intel 64, XD bit (an NX bit implementation), Intel VT-x, Intel EPT, Intel VT-d, Intel VT-c, Intel x8 SDDC
 EC5549, LC5528, and LC5518 support: Hyper-Threading, Turbo Boost
 Die size: 263 mm²
 Steppings: B0

"Westmere-EP" (32 nm) Efficient Performance 
 Based on Westmere microarchitecture
 All models support: MMX, SSE, SSE2, SSE3, SSSE3, SSE4.1, SSE4.2, Enhanced Intel SpeedStep Technology (EIST), Intel 64, XD bit (an NX bit implementation), TXT, Intel VT-x, Intel EPT, Intel VT-d, Intel VT-c, Intel x8 SDDC, AES-NI, Smart Cache, Hyper-Threading, Turbo Boost except E5603, E5606, E5607, L5609
 Dual-socket configurations supported
 Die size: 240 mm²
 Steppings: B1

Xeon 7000-series (multiprocessor)

"Beckton" (45 nm) 
 Based on Nehalem microarchitecture
 All models support: MMX, SSE, SSE2, SSE3, SSSE3, SSE4.1, SSE4.2, Enhanced Intel SpeedStep Technology (EIST), Intel 64, XD bit (an NX bit implementation), TXT, Intel VT-x, Intel EPT, Intel VT-d, Intel VT-c, Intel x8 SDDC, Turbo Boost, Smart Cache, Hyper-Threading except X7542
 65xx models support single- and dual-processor configurations, while 75xx models support up to 8-processor configurations
 Transistors: 2.3 billion
 Die size: 684 mm²
 Steppings: D0

Xeon E7 (multiprocessor)

"Westmere-EX" (32 nm) Expandable 
 Based on Westmere microarchitecture.
 All models support: MMX, SSE, SSE2, SSE3, SSSE3, SSE4.1, SSE4.2, Enhanced Intel SpeedStep Technology (EIST), Intel 64, XD bit (an NX bit implementation), TXT, Intel VT-x, Intel EPT, Intel VT-d, Intel VT-c, Intel DDDC, Hyper-threading (except E7-8837), Turbo Boost, AES-NI, Smart Cache.
 28xx models support single- and dual-processor configurations, 48xx models support up to four-processor configurations, 88xx models support up to eight-processor configurations.
 Transistors: 2.6 billion
 Die size: 513 mm²
 Steppings: A2

References 

Intel Xeon (Nehalem)